Back to the Well is the twenty-fifth studio album released in 2003 by American country music singer Kenny Rogers. The album includes the singles "Harder Cards," "I'm Missing You" and "Handprints on the Wall," all of which charted on the Hot Country Songs chart between 2002 and 2003. "Harder Cards" peaked at number 47, "I'm Missing You" at 49 and "Handprints on the Wall" at 40. The album itself reached number 52 on the Top Country Albums chart.

Critical reception
Peter Cooper of The Tennessean rated the album 3 out of 4 stars, stating that "[t]his album is well-constructed, the songs are well-chosen, and Rogers still sings with the quiver and husk of his 'Gambler' days."

Track listing

Chart performance

References

2003 albums
Kenny Rogers albums
Albums produced by Brent Maher